Guardians of Graxia is a video game and a board game, developed by Petroglyph Games. The game has a turn-based fantasy strategy theme in a board game-style format. The PC version was released on Steam, GamersGate, Impulse, and other digital download services in October 2010.

References

External links 
Official Guardians of Graxia website
Official Heroes of Graxia board game website

2010 video games
Board games introduced in 2010
Fantasy video games
Multiplayer and single-player video games
Petroglyph Games games
Turn-based strategy video games
Video games developed in the United States
Video games scored by Frank Klepacki
Windows games
Windows-only games